Ousterhout's dichotomy is computer scientist John Ousterhout's categorization that high-level programming languages tend to fall into two groups, each with distinct properties and uses: system programming languages and scripting languages – compare programming in the large and programming in the small. This distinction underlies the design of his language Tcl.

System programming languages (or applications languages) usually have the following properties:
 They are typed statically
 They support creating complex data structures
 Programs in them are compiled into machine code
 Programs in them are meant to operate largely independently of other programs
System programming languages tend to be used for components and applications with large amounts of internal functionality such as operating systems, database servers, and Web browsers.  These applications typically employ complex algorithms and data structures and require high performance. Prototypical examples of system programming languages include C, OCaml and Modula-2.

By contrast, scripting languages (or glue languages) tend to have the following properties:
 They are typed dynamically
 They have little or no provision for complex data structures
 Programs in them (scripts) are interpreted
Scripting languages tend to be used for applications where most of the functionality comes from other programs (often implemented in system programming languages); the scripts are used to glue together other programs or add additional layers of functionality on top of existing programs.  Ousterhout claims that scripts tend to be short and are often written by less sophisticated programmers, so execution efficiency is less important than simplicity and ease of interaction with other programs.  Common applications for scripting include Web page generation, report generation, graphical user interfaces, and system administration. Prototypical examples of scripting languages include Python, AppleScript, C shell, DOS batch files, and Tcl.

History
An early episode was "The Tcl War" of late September and October 1994, where Richard Stallman posted an article critical of Tcl, entitled "Why you should not use Tcl", to which Ousterhout replied with an articulation of his dichotomy:

Criticism
Critics believe that the dichotomy is highly arbitrary, and refer to it as Ousterhout's fallacy or Ousterhout's false dichotomy. While static-versus-dynamic typing, data structure complexity, and dependent versus stand-alone might be said to be unrelated features, the usual critique of Ousterhout's dichotomy is of its distinction of compiling versus interpreting. Neither semantics nor syntax depend significantly on whether a language implementation compiles into machine language, interprets, tokenizes, or byte-compiles at the start of each run, or any mix of these. In addition, basically no languages in widespread use are purely interpreted without a compiler; this makes compiling versus interpreting a dubious parameter in a taxonomy of programming languages.

References

Further reading

External links
Ousterhout's dichotomy at the Tcl wiki

Programming language folklore
Software engineering folklore
Programming paradigms
Dichotomies